Tyurdinskaya is a rural locality (a village) in Tarnogskoye Rural Settlement, Tarnogsky District, Vologda Oblast, Russia. The population was 12 as of 2002.

Geography 
Tyurdinskaya is located 33 km northeast of Tarnogsky Gorodok (the district's administrative centre) by road. Borisovskaya is the nearest rural locality.

References 

Rural localities in Tarnogsky District